The Straits Trading Company Limited is a Singapore-based corporation with operations in Singapore and Malaysia, as well as various localities in Asia and Australia.

Founded in 1887, the company was the result of a partnership for tin smelting between James Sword, a Scottish businessman, and Herman Muhlinghaus, a German entrepreneur; the Straits Trading Company was later incorporated in Singapore on 8 November 1887 with a hefty capital of S$150,000 during its days. The company eventually rose to become one of the largest tin smelters in the world, operating at tin rich deposits in the Kinta Valley and Klang Valley of then British Malaya (Peninsular Malaysia).By the late-20th century, the company began diversifying into hotel and property management, and financial investment; it also became a member of the Tecity Group. Mining and smelting operations that the Straits Trading Company was originally engaged in were eventually carried out by its 73%-owned subsidiary, the Malaysia Smelting Corporation Berhad, a public listed company on Bursa Malaysia.

See also
Walter Nutt, Managing Director of Straits Trading Company (1918-1921)

External links 
 Official Straits Trading Company website
 Official Malaysia Smelting Corporation website

1887 establishments in Singapore
Real estate companies of Singapore
Service companies of Singapore
Smelting
Metal companies of Singapore
Singaporean brands